Jõõpre is a village in Audru Parish, Pärnu County, in southwestern Estonia. It is located just southwest of the borough of Lavassaare. Jõõpre has a population of 464 (as of 1 January 2011).

Jõõpre was first mentioned in 1571 as Jeckepere. Jõõpre (Jaepern) state manor was established in the 17th century. 1935 a new schoolhouse was built on the former site of the manor.

Jõõpre Orthodox church was built in 1878.

References

External links
Jõõpre primary school 

Villages in Pärnu County
Kreis Pernau